Benton is a village in Devon, England, within the civil parish of Bratton Fleming.

Villages in Devon